Daphne arbuscula is a species of flowering plant in the family Thymelaeaceaecae, native only to Slovakia. It is endemic species of Muránska planina National Park. It grows on sunny rocky slopes and rock terraces, mostly on sites with a south or southwest exposure, on limestone bedrock, at an altitude of 800–1300 m.

The species is endangered and it is protected by law in Slovakia and also by European law and the Berne Convention on the Conservation of European Wildlife and Natural Habitats. This plant has gained the Royal Horticultural Society's Award of Garden Merit (confirmed 2017).

The Latin specific epithet arbuscula means “like a small tree”.

References

arbuscula
Flora of Slovakia